Ceriana abbreviata  (Loew, 1864), the Northern Wasp Fly , is a rare species of syrphid fly observed across North America and Canada (see map). Hoverflies can remain nearly motionless in flight. The adults are also known as flower flies for they are commonly found on flowers, from which they get both energy-giving nectar and protein-rich pollen. The adults are wasp mimics. The larvae feed on the sap of tree wounds.

References

Eristalinae
Diptera of North America
Hoverflies of North America  
Articles created by Qbugbot
Taxa named by Hermann Loew
Insects described in 1864